The Drummer is a 2007 Hong Kong-Taiwanese drama film written and directed by Kenneth Bi and starring Jaycee Chan, Tony Leung Ka-fai and Angelica Lee. It is Kenneth Bi's second film as a director.

The film was released in Hong Kong on 11 October 2007. It features the Chinese Zen drumming group, U-Theatre. The film is available in the United States on DVD from filmmovement.com.

Summary
Sid, the spoiled son of a gangster (Kwan), is getting caught having a love affair with the girlfriend of a big gangster boss, who is also the boss of his father. To save the life of his son, Kwan sends him to off to Taiwan, where an uncle (Chiu) is watching over him. One day Sid discovers a temple with Zen buddhist practising drums. He joins them and learns important lessons about life.

Cast and roles
 Jaycee Chan as Sid
 Tony Leung Ka-fai as Kwan
 Angelica Lee as Hong Dou
 Roy Cheung as Ah Chiu
 Josie Ho as Sina
 Kenneth Tsang as Stephen Ma
 Yumiko Cheng as Carmen
 Liu Ruo-yu as Lan Jie
 Huang Chih-chun as Sifu (Master)
 Eugenia Yuan as Kwan's wife
 Ken Lo as Long
 Glen Chin as Uncle Tak

Awards and nominations

External links

2007 films
Hong Kong drama films
Taiwanese drama films
2007 drama films
Triad films
2000s Cantonese-language films
2000s Mandarin-language films
Films directed by Kenneth Bi
Films about music and musicians
Films set in Hong Kong
Films shot in Hong Kong
Films set in Taiwan
Films shot in Taiwan
2000s Hong Kong films